Ethiopian nationalism, also referred to as Ethiopianism or Ethiopianness (Ityop̣p̣yawinnät), is a political principle centered on the unification of Ethiopian identity. Originated from throughout ancient history, the Aksumite Empire was the first kingdom for their unified civilization and social integration to adopt the name "Ethiopia" under Ezana's reign in 4th century. For more than a century, Amhara ruling elite used the ideology to pursue an assimilation policy and consolidate power. Moreover, the notion of Ethiopian integrity was reinforced by Battle of Adwa, an important event where Ethiopia defied European colonization by defeating Italy in 1896. 

The Second Italo-Ethiopian War and subsequent Italian occupation of Ethiopia appeared to be foreign aggression and civil war that leads to ethnic faction expressed by student movements. Following the abolition of monarchy and overthrow of Haile Selassie by communist military junta Derg in 1974, Ethiopia underwent several conflicts and civil wars that persists up to today, and the 1991 downfall of the Derg and the raise of the Ethiopian People's Revolutionary Democratic Front (EPRDF) and its ethnic nationalist policies promoted continuum violence and thwarted the Ethiopian unity.

History

The origin of the concept of an Ethiopian nation formed by Ethiopian nationalists is believed to have begun with the Aksumite Kingdom in the 4th century A.D. The Aksumite Kingdom was a predominantly Christian state that at the height of its power controlled the northern Ethiopian Highlands, Eritrea, and the coastal regions of Southern Arabia. The Aksumite Kingdom was responsible for the development of the religious movement that became the Ethiopian Orthodox Tewahedo Church. However, the expansion of Islam in the 7th century caused Aksumite Kingdom to decline. Most of the lowland populations converted to Islam, while the highland people remained Christian. Since the Aksumite people were divided between the Christian highlanders and Islamic lowlanders, religious and tribal tensions and rivalries between the people intensified. The Aksumite society morphed into a loose confederation of city-states that maintained the language of Aksum.

The establishment of modern Ethiopia was mainly led by Amhara emperors Tewodros II of Gondar and Menelik II of Shewa. Tewodros governed from 1855 to 1868 and was followed by Yohannes IV, who was from Tigray and was emperor from 1869 to 1889. He managed to expand his authority into Eritrea. Yohannes was followed by Menelik, who governed from 1889 to 1913 and repelled the Italian invasion of 1896.

Ethiopia, unlike the rest of Africa, had never been colonized in the Scramble for Africa. The country was accepted as the first independent African-governed state at the League of Nations in 1922. Ethiopia was occupied by Italy after the Second Italo-Ethiopian War but was liberated by the Allies during World War II.

After the Second World War, Ethiopia annexed Eritrea. However, ethnic tensions peaked between the Amhara and the Eritrean, Oromo, Somali, and Tigray peoples, each of whom had formed separatist movements dedicated to leaving Amhara-dominated Ethiopia. After the overthrow of the Ethiopian monarchy by the Derg military junta, the country became aligned with the Soviet Union and Cuba after the United States failed to support it in its military struggle with Somali separatists in the Ogaden region. After the end of the military government in Ethiopia in 1993, Eritrea separated from Ethiopia.

Legacy of independence 

In March 1896, a definitive battle took place between the forces of colonial Italy and those of the Ethiopian Empire in a north Ethiopian town called Adwa. The battle was short but extremely violent, with tens of thousands of deaths. At the time, Emperor Menelik II had mobilized and conscripted the Ethiopian people, regardless of class and ethnicities. The mobilization drive led millions of Ethiopian citizens to march from their towns, villages, and cities into the Northern Highlands for the preservation of their nation. The battle would end in a decisive victory for Ethiopia, giving the country with a unique legacy of independence in the face of European aggression.

The Battle of Adwa is the foundation of Ethiopian nationalist ideology. For many Ethiopians, the threat of foreign invasion is the rallying cry for patriotic sacrifices and nationalist ideologues. By the time the battle of Adwa took place, almost all of Africa was dominated by European forces. Ethiopian independence broke the mold of European superiority and provided a beacon of hope for African and black nations and peoples around the world. For many Ethiopians, the moment represents a transitional moment, in which the nation realized its teleological doctrine. While the first war against Italy was a uniting war, the 1934 invasion by Benito Mussolini was extremely divisive. Upon observation on the Ethiopian nation, Charles McClellan argues that the Italo-Abyssinian war of 1934 was in fact "as much a civil war as one against foreign aggression." He also argues the political and factional differences which emerged in Ethiopia prior to the war were not resolved by the Italian invasion but instead amplified. This, in the authors' opinion, led to an era of bitter factionalism which would "define the dynamics of post-war Ethiopian politics."

Era of ethnic federalism 

In 1991, the TPLF had gained almost complete control of the national government, leveraging its power to concentrate wealth and development into the Tigray Region. The hegemonic rule of the Tigray people in Ethiopia was in many ways a reaction to the predominance Amharas had in media and governance. The hegemonic rule of a few ethnic groups or in some cases, a single ethnic group has marginalized many groups within Ethiopia and has led to a cycle of violence and retribution. In the early 1990s, the TPLF believed that through an ethnic federalist state system, one in which regions were assigned and divided by the ethnic population, they could:

While these regions were not given "extensive sub-national control over technical policies, laws, regulations, and tax," their creation lent credibility to the different independence and ethnic nationalist movements around the country. For Ethiopian nationalists, this credibility has emboldened different groups, giving them more cohesion, whilst corroding national unity and notions of Pan-Ethiopianism. The increased autonomy of these groups contrasted with the increased repression by Tigray elites created a situation in which the ruling class was both empowering groups through greater ethnic cohesion, but transparently stifling their political will. As shown by the 2005 elections, the TPLF use of violent repression to subdue detractors of the ruling coalition only had the effect of radicalizing ethnic parties and increasing ethnic divisions. Many Ethiopian nationalists view the system of ethnic federalism as having made governing in Ethiopia a zero-sum game. To win power in Ethiopia is to deny any other ethnic group significant power. By expelling notions of Ethiopianism or multi-ethnic Ethiopian national identity from the national political dialogue, the TPLF has increased the ethnic breaks and created a system revolving around ethnic affiliation, devoid of political ideology. In 2015, after a master plan was unveiled to expand the boundaries of the Ethiopian capital Addis Ababa into Oromia in 2014, thousands of Oromo Youth Liberation Movement members took to the streets to demand increased political representation, an end to the TPLF-sponsored Master Plan, and avenues of dissent. Although the ruling party tried to blunt these protests through physical force, the protests only grew. Amharas "angered by an unfulfilled demand to retake control of some of their lands" launched protests consisting of mostly Oromos and Amharas (but also other Ethiopians) demanding proportional political representation and influence. After a 10-month state of emergency imposed by the TPLF, which saw the abdication of prime minister Hailemariam Desalegn and Abiy Amhed—was selected by the ruling EPDRF coalition as the next prime minister due to his mixed Oromo-Amhara ethnic ancestry with a preference for his Oromo identity. Since Abiy took power, he has taken up major reforms allowing back political dissidents, releasing some political prisoners, and liberalizing the economy. While his drive to reform and democratize the nation has garnered him support across the country, he still has not addressed the fundamental issues of the ethnic federalist system, which in the Pan-Ethiopians' opinion is the root cause for ethno-nationalist politics and tensions. Ethiopian nationalists believe that ethnic federalism must be ended to shift Ethiopian politics from ethnic patronage to ideology, it must be ended to induce national cohesion and blunt sectarian loyalty, and through the blunting of ethnic cohesion induce an era of unity and prosperity.

Abiy and the Prosperity Party have been seen as supporters of Ethiopian civic nationalism due to the merger of the Oromo Democratic Party with the ethnicity-based Amhara Democratic Party, Argoba People's Democratic Organization, Benishangul-Gumuz People's Democratic Unity Front, Ethiopian Somali People's Democratic Party, Gambela People's Democratic Movement, Afar National Democratic Party, Hareri National League, and the Southern Ethiopian People's Democratic Movement political parties into the new multi-ethnic Prosperity Party, thus moving these predecessor parties away from their ethnic nationalist and pro-ethnic federalism past into a party that promotes Ethiopian national identity, and non-ethnicity based federalism. All of these goals are seen by opponents as steps towards taking political powers based on group rights away from the various ethnic groups. Proponents of the merger see it as a way to move Ethiopian politics and governmental administration away from ethnicity-based identity politics, supporting the individual rights of each person. This outlook more intensely mitigates rising ethnic nationalism, fosters national unity and solidarity, and creates inclusive democratic process involving political parties of several ethnic groups and regions that were once deemed too inferior by the Tigray People's Liberation Front-led Ethiopian People's Revolutionary Democratic Front regime. Eventually, proponents hope to see the transition a to one-party dominated coalition government or be full partakers in revolutionary democracy because of their largely pastoralist way of life.

See also
 Ethiopian Empire
 Ethiopianism
Neftenya

References

Bibliography

 
Nationalism